Singapore–Trinidad and Tobago relations are bilateral relations between Singapore and Trinidad and Tobago. Trinidad and Tobago has a High Commission in New Delhi which deals with all diplomatic relations with Singapore

Both Singapore and Trinidad and Tobago are republics in the Commonwealth of Nations.

History

In 1971, Singapore officially established diplomatic relations with Trinidad and Tobago, the first country within CARICOM that it established relations with.

Trade

Singapore was Trinidad and Tobago's 3rd largest import partner in 2015, making up 4.6% of all imports totaling US$269 Million. 99% of all exports from T&T to Singapore were refined oil, while exports to Trinidad were more varied, ranging from rolled tobacco to passenger ships.

See also 

 Foreign relations of Singapore
 Foreign relations of Trinidad and Tobago

Notes and references

External links 

 
Trinidad and Tobago
Singapore
Singapore and the Commonwealth of Nations
Trinidad and Tobago and the Commonwealth of Nations